Skála (reclaimed its original name Skála as opposed to incorrect Skáli in 2011; is a village on the east coast of the Faroese island of Eysturoy, located in Runavík Municipality.

Its postal code is FO 480. It has a population of 756 (December 2022). The current church in the village was opened in 1940.

Skála is home to the largest shipyard in the Faroe Islands, with its fine harbour and good reputation for shipbuilding and repairs.

Sports
The village soccer team is called Skála Ítróttarfelag or Skála ÍF and the Skála Stadium is capable of accommodating 2000 spectators.

The women's team is called EB-streymur/Skála.

See also 
 List of towns in the Faroe Islands

References 

Populated places in the Faroe Islands